The 2021 Southeastern Conference women's basketball tournament was a postseason women's basketball tournament for the Southeastern Conference held at the Bon Secours Wellness Arena in Greenville, South Carolina, March 3–7, 2021. Vanderbilt cancelled its season after going 4-4 and did not compete in the conference tournament. By winning, South Carolina earned an automatic bid to the 2021 NCAA Division I women's basketball tournament.

Seeds

Schedule

Bracket

See also 
 2021 SEC men's basketball tournament

References

2020–21 Southeastern Conference women's basketball season
SEC women's basketball tournament
Basketball competitions in Greenville, South Carolina
SEC Women's Basketball
College basketball tournaments in South Carolina